The 2011–12 Tennessee State Tigers basketball team represented Tennessee State University during the 2011–12 NCAA Division I men's basketball season. The Tigers, led by third year head coach John Cooper, played their home games at the Gentry Complex and are members of the Ohio Valley Conference. They finished the season 20–13, 11–5 in OVC play to finish in second place. They lost in the championship game of the Ohio Valley Basketball tournament to Murray State. They were invited to the 2012 CollegeInsider.com Tournament where they lost in the first round to Mercer.

Roster

Schedule

|-
!colspan=9| Exhibition

|-
!colspan=9| Regular season

|-
!colspan=9| 2012 OVC Basketball tournament

|-
!colspan=9| 2012 CIT

References

Tennessee State Tigers basketball seasons
Tennessee State
Tennessee State